{{DISPLAYTITLE:C14H12N2O2}}
The molecular formula C14H12N2O2 may refer to:

 N-Benzoyl-N′-phenylurea
 1,4-Diamino-2,3-dihydroanthraquinone
 Dibenzoylhydrazine